Arthur Henry Brouthers (November 25, 1882 – September 28, 1959) was an American professional baseball player.  He was a third baseman for one season (1906) with the Philadelphia Athletics.  For his career, he compiled a .208 batting average in 144 at-bats, with 14 runs batted in.

He was born in Montgomery, Alabama and later died in Charleston, South Carolina at the age of 76.

External links

1882 births
1959 deaths
Philadelphia Athletics players
Major League Baseball third basemen
Baseball players from Montgomery, Alabama
Shreveport Giants players
Birmingham Barons players
New Orleans Pelicans (baseball) players
Toledo Mud Hens players
Montgomery Senators players
Johnstown Johnnies players
Trenton Tigers players
Baltimore Orioles (IL) players
Elmira Colonels players
Altoona Rams players
Augusta Tourists players
Paducah Chiefs players
Minor league baseball managers